"Lover, Knight, Man" (stylized as LOVER, KNIGHT, MAN), is female duo Soulhead's second single under Sony Music Entertainment Japan. It managed to reach #36 on the Oricon charts and charted for eight weeks.

Information
While a music video for Lover, Knight, Man was released, it was not released on the single or its corresponding album, Oh My Sister, but was placed on the DVD Oh My Sister Live & Clips. Like their debut single, Step to the New World, Lover, Knight, Man was also released on CD and vinyl.

The album was titled after the b-side from this single, Oh My Sister.

Track listing

CD
(Source)
"Lover, Knight, Man"
"Oh My Sister"
"Lover, Knight, Man" (Instrumental)
"Oh My Sister" (Instrumental)

12" Vinyl
Side A
"Lover, Knight, Man"
"Lover, Knight, Man" (Instrumental)
"Lover, Knight, Man" (A Capella)
Side B
"Oh My Sister"
"Oh My Sister" (Instrumental)
"Oh My Sister" (A Capella)

Charts and sales

References

2002 singles
Sony Music Entertainment Japan singles
2002 songs
Song articles with missing songwriters